Centro Universitario de Aviación is an airport serving La Matanza Partido, a southern district in the Greater Buenos Aires conurbation. The airport is located within a bend of the Matanza River in the partido.

The airport was begun by the Centro Universitario de Aviación in 1929 as a center for pilot training.

Approaches to Runway 27 and Runway 35 are over residential areas, and both runways have displaced thresholds, not included in runway length.

See also

Transport in Argentina
List of airports in Argentina

References

External links 
OpenStreetMap - Centro Universitario de Aviación
OurAirports - Matanza Airport
FallingRain - Matanza Airport

Airports in Argentina
Buenos Aires Province